Roger Lewis Worsley (born March 22, 1937) is a retired college administrator, who from 1985 to 1995 was the president of Laredo Community College in Laredo, Texas. He also from 1996 to 2005 served as the chancellor of Southern Arkansas University Tech in Camden, Arkansas.

References 

1937 births
Heads of universities and colleges in the United States
Baptists from Texas
Florida Democrats
Living people
Midland High School (Midland, Michigan) alumni
People from Camden, Arkansas
People from Cass County, North Dakota
People from Forsyth County, Georgia
People from Hot Springs, Arkansas
People from Laredo, Texas
People from Midland, Michigan
People from Lake County, Florida
Baptists from Michigan
Baptists from Arkansas